The 1859 Fordham Rose Hill Baseball Club team played in the first college baseball game under Knickerbocker Rules in the 1859 college baseball season. The team was composed of students at Fordham University's St. John's College.  In the game played November 3, 1859, they beat St. Francis Xavier 33–11.

Schedule

References

Fordham Rose Hill
Fordham Rams baseball seasons
Fordham Rose Hill baseball